Lover for a Day is a 2017 French drama film directed by Philippe Garrel and starring Éric Caravaca, Esther Garrel, and Louise Chevillotte. It was screened in the Directors' Fortnight section at the 2017 Cannes Film Festival. At Cannes, it won the SACD Award. It is the third and final installment in Garrel's trilogy of love, the first being Jealousy (2013) and the second being In the Shadow of Women (2015).

Plot
A philosophy professor named Gilles (Éric Caravaca) has a relationship with Ariane (Louise Chevillotte), who is one of his students. Gilles' daughter, Jeanne (Esther Garrel), moves in to live with them after being kicked out of her boyfriend's apartment.

Cast
Éric Caravaca as Gilles
Esther Garrel as Jeanne
Louise Chevillotte as Ariane

Release
The film had its world premiere in the Directors' Fortnight section at the Cannes Film Festival on 19 May 2017. Shortly after, MUBI acquired U.S., U.K., and Ireland distribution rights to the film. It was released in France on 31 May 2017. The film went onto screen at the New York Film Festival on 10 October 2017.

It was released in the United States on 12 January 2018, and in the United Kingdom on 19 January 2018.

Reception
Lover for a Day received positive reviews from film critics. It holds an 82% approval rating on review aggregator website Rotten Tomatoes, based on 51 reviews, with a weighted average of 6.9/10. The website's critical consensus reads, "Lover for a Day offers an absorbing character study that's as well-acted and believable as it is beautifully filmed." On Metacritic, the film holds a rating of 69 out of 100, based on 14 critics, indicating "generally favorable reviews".

Pamela Pianezza of Variety called the film "an alluring and very elegantly crafted — though largely predictable — romantic dramedy that should do well in territories where the French auteur is already known and esteemed."

Cahiers du cinéma placed the film at number 6 on its list of the top 10 films of 2017.

References

External links

2017 drama films
French drama films
2010s French-language films
Films directed by Philippe Garrel
2010s French films